Siti Nurbaya Bakar (born 28 August 1956) is the Minister of Environment and Forestry in Indonesian President Joko Widodo's Working Cabinet.

Early life
Siti was born in Jakarta on 28 July 1956, the daughter of Mochammad Bakar, a police officer from Jakarta, and Sri Banon from Lampung province.

After completing SMA Negeri 8 Jakarta high school in Jakarta, she studied at Bogor Agricultural Institute (IPB), earning a degree in engineering.

Career
After graduating from college, she started work in 1981 for the Regional Development Planning Board (Bappeda) in Lampung and remained there for 17 years.

In 1998, she moved back to Jakarta to work in the Home Affairs Ministry. She served as secretary general of the ministry for the 2001–2005 period. She was alleged to have received Rp 100 million in a fire truck procurement deal when she was the secretary general at the Home Affairs Ministry, but she was not pursued by the Corruption Eradication Commission (KPK) because she  said the project had involved the minister and the ministry's director general without going through her.

She was appointed by president Susilo Bambang Yudhoyono as secretary general of the Regional Representatives Council (DPD) for 2006–2013.

In January 2013, Siti stepped down from the DPD and joined media tycoon Surya Paloh’s National Democrat Party. In 2014, she was elected to the House of Representatives (DPR), representing Lampung electoral district for the 2014–2019 period. She soon had to retire from the DPR after being appointed Minister of Environment and Forestry by President Joko Widodo.

Personal life
Siti is married to Rusli Rachman and they have two children: Meitra Mivida and Ananda Tohpati.

References 

1956 births
Bogor Agricultural University alumni
Government ministers of Indonesia
Living people
Lampung people
Working Cabinet (Joko Widodo)
People from Jakarta
Onward Indonesia Cabinet